The 2007 World Touring Car Championship season was the 4th season of FIA World Touring Car Championship motor racing. The championship, which commenced on 11 March and ended on 18 November, after twenty-two races, was open to Super 2000 Cars, Diesel 2000 Cars and Super Production Cars  as defined by the relevant FIA regulations. The Drivers' Championship was won by Andy Priaulx and the Manufacturers' Championship by BMW.

Teams and drivers

The following teams and drivers contested the 2007 FIA World Touring Car Championship.

Driver changes
Changed Teams
 Augusto Farfus: N-Technology → BMW Team Germany
 James Thompson: SEAT Sport → N-Technology
 Emmet O'Brien: Wiechers-Sport → GR Asia
 Pierre-Yves Corthals: Jas Motorsport → Exagon Engineering
 Stefano D'Aste: Proteam Motorsport → Wiechers-Sport

Entering WTCC including those who entered one-off rounds in 2006
 Félix Porteiro: GP2 Series → BMW Team Italy-Spain
 Michel Jourdain Jr.: NASCAR Craftman Truck Series → SEAT Sport
 Tiago Monteiro: Formula 1 → SEAT Sport
 Olivier Tielemans: DTM → N-Technology
 Roberto Colciago: Italian Superturismo Championship → SEAT Sport Italia
 Sergio Hernández: GP2 Series → Scuderia Proteam Motorsport
 Miguel Freitas: Eurocup Mégane Trophy → Racing for Belgium

Leaving WTCC
 Peter Terting: SEAT Sport → International GT Open
 Duncan Huisman: BMW Team Italy-Spain → No full-time drive
 Gianni Morbidelli: N-Technology → Superstars Series
 Salvatore Tavano: N-Technology → Le Mans Series
 Ryan Sharp: Jas Motorsport → FIA GT Championship
 Diego Romanini: Wiechers-Sport → Eurocup Mégane Trophy
 Dirk Müller: BMW Team Germany → FIA GT Championship

Calendar

A provisional calendar was released on 15 January 2007.. On 27 February 2007, the FIA announced that the 13th and 14th races of the series originally scheduled to be run in Istanbul would instead take place at the Anderstorp circuit.

Each race weekend featured two races of 50 kilometres each (similar to Superbike World Championship race format). If the safety car was deployed during a race, the first two laps under it were not counted towards the race distance.

The starting grid order for the first race of each weekend was determined by the results of qualifying and the race began with a rolling start. The second race grid order was determined by the results of the first race with the top eight positions reversed. The second race began with a standing start.

Results and standings

Races

Standings

Drivers' Championship

† — Drivers did not finish the race, but were classified as they completed over 90% of the race distance.

Point system: 10–8–6–5–4–3–2–1 for top eight finishers in each race.

Drivers with 0 points were not classified in official championship results.

* Phillip Geipel, Robert Dahlgren, Colin Turkington and David Louie were not eligible to score championship points. Thus, 9th-place finishers scored points in the Race 2 of Sweden, Race 1 & 2 of the United Kingdom and Race 2 of Macau.

Yokohama Independents' Trophy
Championship promoter KSO organised the Yokohama Independents’ Trophies within the 2007 FIA World Touring Car Championship.

Drivers were awarded points towards the Independents' Trophy in the first twenty rounds on a 10–8–6–5–4–3–2–1 basis for the first eight finishers of those entries which were classified as Independents. Points were awarded in the final two rounds on a 20-16-12-10-8-6-4-2 basis.

 * Guest driver

Yokohama Teams' Trophy
The Yokohama Teams' Trophy was won by Proteam Motorsport.

Manufacturers' Championship

Points were awarded on a 10–8–6–5–4–3–2–1 basis in each race but only to the top two placegetters from each manufacturer. All the other cars of that same manufacturer were considered invisible as far as scoring points was concerned.

Notes

References

External links

 2007 Season at www.fiawtcc.com via web.archive.org 
 2007 FIA World Touring Car Championship at www.teamdan.com